Bobby Kelsey (born 8 December 1938) is a British boxer. He competed in the men's light welterweight event at the 1960 Summer Olympics. At the 1960 Summer Olympics, he defeated Vazik Kazarian of Iran, before losing to Quincey Daniels of the United States.

References

1938 births
Living people
British male boxers
Olympic boxers of Great Britain
Boxers at the 1960 Summer Olympics
Boxers from Greater London
Light-welterweight boxers